The Ankasa Conservation Area is an area in southwestern Ghana, in Ghana's Western Region, about 365 kilometres west of Accra near the border with Côte d'Ivoire.  It incorporates the Nini Suhien National Park in the North, and the Ankasa Forest Reserve in the South.

The park is approximately 500 square kilometers, and consists largely of tropical evergreen rainforest. The Ankasa Conservation Area is the only wildlife protected area in Ghana that is located in the wet evergreen tropical high rainforest belt. The Ankasa, Nini, and Suhien Rivers all pass through the park, and are known for their rapids and waterfalls.  The forest has the most biological diversity of any in Ghana, with over 800 vascular plant species, 639 butterfly species, and more than 190 bird species. Animal life includes the elephant, bongo, leopard, chimpanzee, Diana monkey, and other primates. Apart from the forest reserve which was selectively logged until 1976, the rest of the protected area is almost intact.

The park includes basic camping facilities with shelters, toilets, and running water along with many facilities for sitting down and having a chat.

External links

 Ghana Ministry of Tourism -- official site
Ghana Wildlife Society (Accessed June 2014)
Status of Great Apes in the area

References

Eastern Guinean forests
Protected areas of Ghana
Western Region (Ghana)